Borgia is a town and comune in the province of Catanzaro, in the Calabria region of southern Italy.

The ancient city of Scylletium was located in the frazione of Roccelletta of Borgia.

References

Cities and towns in Calabria